Petris may refer to:

Places 
 Petriș (Hungarian: Marospetres), a commune in Arad County, Romania, in the contact zone of Mureș Couloir with Metaliferi Mountains
 Petriș (river), right tributary of the river Mureș in Romania

People 
 Gianfranco Petris (1936–2018), Italian football player
 Leandro De Petris (born 1988),  Argentine professional footballer
 Loredana De Petris (born 1957), Italian politician and senator of Italian Left
 Nicholas C. Petris (1923–2013), American politician, California State Senator from 1966 until 1996
 Nicolas C. Petris (20th century), Californian politician and soldier of U.S. Army during World War II
 Tiberiu Petriș (born 1994), Romanian professional footballer

See also 
 Petri
 Di Pietro

Italian-language surnames